Jules is an upcoming American film directed by Marc Turtletaub and starring Ben Kingsley and Jane Curtin.

Cast
Ben Kingsley as Milton
Jane Curtin
Harriet Sansom Harris
Zoë Winters
Donald Paul

Production
Filming began in New Jersey on September 10, 2021.  Filming occurred in Boonton, New Jersey and Chatham, New Jersey.  The film is in post-production as of February 2022.

Release
The film will premiere at the Sonoma International Film Festival on March 22, 2023.

References

External links
 

Upcoming films
Films shot in New Jersey